Owen Cyril Dampier Bennett was Dean of Nassau from 1921 until 1934.

Dampier Bennett was educated at University College, Durham and ordained in 1903. After curacies in Newchurch, Lancashire, and Paddington, he was rector of Abberley before his time as dean and vicar of Ringmer afterwards.

References

Deans of Nassau
Alumni of University College, Durham
Year of birth missing
Year of death missing